Beu is a town and commune of Angola, located in the province of Uíge.

See also 

 Communes of Angola

References 

Populated places in Uíge Province